Neon Rider is a Canadian drama television series which first aired between 1990 and 1995. Created by Winston Rekert and Danny Virtue, the show was about the title character, a psychologist named Michael Terry (Rekert) who, after writing a successful book on adolescent psychology, purchases his childhood friend's family ranch just outside of Mission, British Columbia to open a therapeutic residential treatment program for troubled and abused teens. The series was filmed and set in Vancouver, and British Columbia's Lower Mainland and Fraser Valley.

Other cast members included Samuel Sarkar, William S. Taylor, Peter Williams, Suzanne Errett-Balcom, Antoinette Bower, Barbara Tyson, Alex Bruhanski, Philip Granger and Jim Byrnes.

Neon Rider was produced by Alliance Atlantis and broadcast on the CTV Television Network on Saturdays at 10 PM then moved to 8 PM in 1991. CTV cancelled the series in 1992 after which original episodes continued to air on the youth-oriented cable network YTV and in syndication.

The series was also popular in Gibraltar where it aired on GBC TV.

Cast
Winston Rekert as Michael Terry
Samuel Sarkar as Vic
Barbara Tyson as Eleanor James (seasons 2–5)
William S. Taylor as John Philip Reid III
Alex Bruhanski as C.C. Dechardon (season 1)
Antoinette Bower as Fox Devlin (seasons 1–3)
Peter Williams as Pin 
Suzanne Errett-Balcom as Rachel Woods (seasons 1-5)
Philip Granger as Walt (seasons 2-5)
Jim Byrnes as Kevin (seasons 2-5)

Episodes

Season 1

Season 2: 1991

Season 3

Season 4

Season 5

See also
Higher Ground, a similarly themed series.
Outriders, a similarly themed series.

References

External links
Canadian Communications Foundation - Article about Neon Rider

1990s Canadian drama television series
1990 Canadian television series debuts
1995 Canadian television series endings
CTV Television Network original programming
Mission, British Columbia
Television series by Alliance Atlantis
Television shows filmed in Vancouver
Television shows set in Vancouver